Tio may refer to:

 Tio (Zatch Bell!) a character from the Zatch Bell!, a Japanese manga series
 T'í'o, aka "Tiyo", a city in Eritrea 
 Tio, Burkina Faso, a town in Burkina Faso
 Tió de Nadal, a character in Catalan mythology
 TiO, the chemical formula for titanium(II) oxide
 "TiO" (Zayn song), 2016
 Celina Tio, American chef
 Elkan William Tio Baggott, Indonesia professional football player
 Tio Salamanca, a fictional character in Breaking Bad and Better Call Saul
 Tio Pakusadewo, Indonesian actor

See also 
 Thio (disambiguation)